Ásgeirsson is a surname of Icelandic origin, meaning son of Ásgeir. In Icelandic names, the name is not strictly a surname, but a patronymic. The name may refer to:
Áki Ásgeirsson (born 1975), Icelandic musician and composer
Ásgeir Ásgeirsson (1894–1972), Icelandic politician; second president of Iceland 1952–68
Ásgeir Gunnar Ásgeirsson (born 1980), Icelandic professional football player
Ásmundur Ásgeirsson (1906–1986), Icelandic chess master
Benedikt Ásgeirsson (born 1951), Icelandic diplomat; ambassador to Russia
Magni Ásgeirsson (born 1978), Icelandic singer and songwriter
Sturla Ásgeirsson (born 1980), Icelandic professional handball player

Icelandic-language surnames